Czarne railway station is a railway station serving the town of Czarne, in the Pomeranian Voivodeship, Poland. The station is located on the Chojnice–Runowo Pomorskie railway. The train services are operated by Przewozy Regionalne.

The station used to be known as Hamerstein.

Train services
The station is served by the following service(s):

Regional services (R) Słupsk — Miastko — Szczecinek — Chojnice
Regional services (R) Szczecinek — Chojnice

References 

Czarne article at Polish Stations Database, URL accessed at 7 March 2006

Railway stations in Pomeranian Voivodeship
Człuchów County